Asplenium resiliens, the blackstem spleenwort  or little ebony spleenwort, is a species of fern native to the Western Hemisphere, ranging from the southern United States south to Uruguay, including parts of the Caribbean. Found on limestone substrates, it is named for its distinctive purplish-black stipe and rachis. A triploid, it is incapable of sexual reproduction and produces spores apogamously. First described by Martens and Galeotti in 1842 under the previously used name Asplenium parvulum, the species was given its current, valid name by Kunze in 1844. Several similar species are known from the tropics; A. resiliens may have arisen from these species by reticulate evolution, but precise relationships among the group are not yet certain.

Description
It is a small fern with pinnate fronds, growing in erect tufts, with a shiny black stipe and rachis (stem and leaf axis). Sterile and fertile fronds are similar in appearance.

The roots are thin and wiry and do not proliferate to form new plants. It has variously been described as sometimes branching or unbranched. It bears stiff filamentous, linear, or lance-shaped scales, which are blackish in color and obscurely clathrate (bearing a lattice-like pattern) or entirely black.

The stipe (the stalk of the leaf, below the blade) is straight and stiff and a glossy black to purplish-black in color. It is round in cross-section but slightly flattened adaxially and has indistinct wings  on either side, or lacks them entirely.

The leaf blade is linear in shape, sometimes slightly wider below the tip or just above the base. It abruptly converges to a lobed, pointed tip and gradually tapers at its base. Unlike the related Palmer's spleenwort (A. palmeri), it does not form proliferating buds at the tip; however, the pinnatifid is often deciduous, leaving behind a naked rachis. The leaf tissue is often bluish-green and thick in texture, not quite leathery. The rachis, like the stipe, is rounded, blackish and shiny; it may be smooth or have a few of the tan hairs found on the stipe. The winging of the stipe extends up the rachis; it is variously described as taking the form of parallel, cartilaginous ribs, with a narrow, green, leafy wing, the ribs fusing into a wing towards the tip of the leaf, or a whitish to tan wing similar in dimensions to that of the stipe.

The blade is cut into pinnae throughout its length, from 20 to 40 pairs per leaf. The pinnae are sessile (stalkless) or have minute stalks and are rectangular in shape, tapering slightly toward the tip. Each pinna usually has an auricle at its base, pointing towards the tip of the blade; occasionally auricles pointing towards the base of the blade are also present. The edges of the pinnae are untoothed or have shallowly rounded teeth (or deep, rounded teeth in exceptional shade-grown specimens), and are often rolled under. The tips of the pinnae are blunt. The lower pinnae are widely spaced on the rachis, and reflexed downwards. Leaf veins are free (they do not rejoin one another) and are difficult to see; fertile veins are once-forking and do not terminate in hydathodes (prominent swellings). They are persistent after the spores mature, but may be hidden by the full sporangia. A. resiliens has a chromosome number of n = 2n = 108 and produces 32 unreduced, round or egg-shaped spores per sporangium.

Similar species
A. resiliens resembles several of its congeners; in particular, it belongs to a group comprising varicolored spleenwort (A. heterochroum), [[Asplenium nesioticum|A. nesioticum]], and A. palmeri, as well as A. resiliens. The members of this group all share dark, lustrous stipes and lack prominent hydathodes on the surface of the blade, the latter characteristic distinguishing them from single-sorus spleenwort (A. monanthes) and others. Among the group, A. resiliens has a slightly more leathery leaf texture than the rest, lacks distinct teeth on the pinna margins, and tends to have once-forked, rather than simple, fertile veins. Stolze noted that specimens with leaf texture so thick as to obscure the veins may be identified as A. resiliens, as A. heterochroum and A. palmeri very rarely become this leathery.

In the more temperate parts of its range, A. resiliens may be confused with ebony spleenwort (A. platyneuron) and maidenhair spleenwort (A. trichomanes). Its stipe and rachis are darker and its pinnae smaller and more rounded than that of A. platyneuron, which also displays frond dimorphism with prostrate sterile fronds. The pinnae of A. resiliens are more widely spaced than those of A. trichomanes, which also lack the upward-pointing auricle, the texture of the leaf tissue is more leathery, and the stipe darker.

A hybrid between A. resiliens and A. heterochroum, Morzenti's spleenwort (A. heteroresiliens), is found in Florida and the Carolinas. As A. resiliens is triploid and A. heterochroum is tetraploid, the hybrid is pentaploid and reproduces apogamously. The hybrid is difficult to distinguish from the parental species, being intermediate in morphology; its fertile veins are sometimes less forked than in A. resiliens, its leaves tend to have more toothed edges, and it bears misshapen sterile spores together with large, globose, unreduced spores. In A. resiliens, the sori are close to the pinna margin; in A. heteroresiliens, they are slightly closer to the margin than to the costa.

Taxonomy
The species was described from Mexico in 1842 by Martin Martens and Henri Guillaume Galeotti. However, the name they chose, Asplenium parvulum, had already been used, rendering their name a later illegitimate homonym. It was first described under its valid name, A. resiliens, by Gustav Kunze in 1844. He did not discuss the reason for his choice of epithet, although it may refer to the springy character of the stems. In 1848, Kunze assigned North American material of A. resiliens the name A. trichomanoides, believing it to be the plant described under that name by André Michaux; in fact, Michaux's material was ebony spleenwort, and in any case the name A. trichomanoides was preoccupied and invalid. W. J. Hooker considered it a variety of ebony spleenwort, giving it the name A. ebeneum var. minus in 1860, but others continued to maintain it as a separate species; Eaton refers to it as "little ebony spleenwort". Oliver Atkins Farwell transferred it to a segregate genus as Chamaefilix resiliens in 1931, but this name was never widely accepted.

In 1940, A.H.G. Alston described material from Argentina, previously identified with A. trichomanes, as a new species, A. lealii, which he named for its collector, Adrián Ruiz Leal. He noted that this species resembled A. resiliens, but had fewer hyaline cells on the scale margins. This species is now treated as a synonym of A. resiliens.

A global phylogeny of Asplenium published in 2020 divided the genus into eleven clades, which were given informal names pending further taxonomic study. A. resiliens, A. heterochroum, and A. palmeri belong to the "A. monanthes subclade" of the "A. trichomanes clade". The A. trichomanes clade has a worldwide distribution. Members of the clade grow on rocks and have once-pinnate leaf blades with slender, chestnut- to dark-brown stalks. The A. monanthes subclade principally occurs in the Neotropics. Within this group, a study based on nuclear and plastid genetic markers, using material from the United States, Mexico, and Costa Rica, showed that A. resiliens forms a clade with A. palmeri and specimens resembling A. heterochroum. Within this clade, the latter two formed a sister clade to A. resiliens. Plastid markers indicated that the A. resiliens clade was divided into two separate groups, while nuclear markers from two distinct groups were distributed among the samples, with five specimens carrying markers from both groups, and one specimen each carrying markers from only one of the groups. This suggests that A. resiliens developed by reticulate evolution, i.e., as the descendant of a hybrid between two taxa, each parental taxon carrying the one of the two groups of plastid and nuclear makers. In addition, of two specimens, one morphologically identified as A. resiliens, and one as A. palmeri, both were found to contain a nuclear marker from the A. resiliens clade and another from the A. palmeri clade. While apogamous specimens of A. palmeri are known, it is typically a sexually reproducing species, and the implication of these specimens is unclear.

Distribution and habitatAsplenium resiliens is found in the southern United States, Mexico, Hispaniola, Jamaica, Guatemala, and South America from Colombia and Venezuela south to northern Argentina, Uruguay, and Brazil. Within the United States, it is found from Florida west to Arizona and southern Nevada and north to south-central Pennsylvania. It is found throughout most of Mexico, but is most abundant in the northeast, in Nuevo León and Coahuila. In Guatemala, it is known from the western departments of Huehuetenango, El Quiché, and Sololá. In Argentina, its distribution follows the arc of the mountains from Jujuy Province southward to the Sierra de la Ventana in Buenos Aires Province; it is also known from Mendoza Province, in the west of the country, from the departments of Las Heras and Luján de Cuyo.

It is found on or at the base of cliffs or sinkholes, on limestone or other alkaline rocks, although specimens have also been reported from crevices in granite and sandstone. Growth on soil is rare. It may be found in forests or on boulders, ledges, and in crevices of cliffs. These differences (observed in Guatemalan and Peruvian material) are believed to be due to environmental factors rather than any taxonomic distinction.

Ecology and conservationAsplenium resiliens is a triploid and reproduces apogamously, producing 32 spores per sporangium. Specimens with 64 well-formed spores per sporangium, believed to be sexually reproducing, were collected from Green Gulch in the Chisos Mountains in 1937, although other specimens since collected in the area have the typical 32 spores per sporangium.

While globally secure, it is considered an endangered species in many of the states at the northern edge of its North American range. NatureServe considers it to be critically imperiled (S1) in Colorado, Illinois, Indiana, Maryland, Mississippi, Nevada, Pennsylvania, South Carolina, and Utah, imperiled (S2) in Kansas and North Carolina, and vulnerable (S3) in West Virginia. It has become extinct in Louisiana since the limestone caprock of a salt dome at Winnfield, the only location for the fern in the state, was quarried away. It is also believed to be extinct in Ohio, where it was last collected in 1900, although suitable habitat still exists in the state.

Quarrying of the calcareous rocks on which it grows poses a "low-level" threat to the species.

CultivationAsplenium resiliens'' is tolerant of cold to USDA hardiness zone 6. It prefers moist conditions, a basic potting soil, and a medium amount of light.

Notes and references

Notes

References

Works cited

External links

Illinois conservation assessment
Comparison to other Arizona ferns
Good illustrations of the plant

resiliens
Plants described in 1844
Ferns of the Americas